Fogera cattle is an Ethiopian breed of cattle. One of its typical characteristics are broad hoofs, that allow it to move more easily in the marshes of the Fogera Plain. At Woreta, the agricultural research centre specialises in preserving the breed.

Origin of the cattle breed 
Ethiopia has been at a crossroads for cattle immigration to Africa due to
 proximity to the geographical entry of Indian and Arabian zebu
 proximity to Near-Eastern and European taurine
 introgression with West African taurine due to pastoralism
Furthermore, the diverse agro-ecology led to diverse farming systems which, in turn, made Ethiopia a centre of secondary diversification for livestock : 
 The Sanga cattle originated in Ethiopia. They are a major bovine group in Africa – a cross-breeding of local long-horned taurines and Arabian zebus
 The Zenga (Zebu-Sanga) breeds, which resulted from a second introduction and crossing with Indian zebu. The Fogera cattle are part of this group

Closely related types
 Arado cattle

Stresses on the cattle breed 
 socio-political: urbanisation, and civil wars
 panzootic: cattle plague
 environmental: destruction of ecosystems and droughts
 cross-breeding with Arado cattle

References 

Cattle breeds
Cattle breeds originating in Ethiopia